Post-colonial anarchism is a term used to describe anarchism in an anti-imperialist framework. Whereas traditional anarchism arose from industrialized Western nations—and thus sees history from their perspective—post-colonial anarchism approaches the same principles of anarchism from the perspective of colonized peoples. It is highly critical of the contributions of the established anarchist movement, and seeks to add what it sees as a unique and important perspective. The tendency is strongly influenced by indigenism, anti-state forms of nationalism, and anarchism among ethnic minorities, among other sources.

The term was first coined by Roger White. Between 1994 and 2004, White wrote a series of essays reflecting on his experiences in the anarchist movement. He identifies racial isolation and tokenism as important features of the experience of people of color in the anarchist movement and attributes this to the prevalence European universalism and an approach to class struggle as a binary relationship between workers and capitalists which does not take account of the cultural aspects of imperialism.

Issues 

Post-colonial anarchism is syncretic and diverse, incorporating a wide range of sources, as is to be expected from a tendency which draws from such a wide range of perspectives.

Nationalism

Anarchism and nationalism have a long history, going back to prominent anarchist theorist Mikhail Bakunin's early involvement in the Pan-Slavic movement. Anarchists have participated in left-nationalist movements in China, Korea, Vietnam, Ireland, Brittany, Ukraine, Poland, Mexico, Israel, and many other nations.

Post-colonial anarchism argues that a key element of imperialism is the waging of culture war by the conquerors against subject nations in an attempt to destroy the identity of the conquered and make them easier to govern. Post-colonial anarchism therefore seeks not only the abolition of capitalism and the state, but is an effort by colonized peoples to promote, preserve, and defend their cultures, dignity, and identity. As Ashanti Alston puts it in "Beyond Nationalism but Not Without It":

For me, even the nationalism of a Louis Farrakhan is about saving my people, though it is also thoroughly sexist, capitalist, homophobic and potentially fascist. Yet, it has played an important part in keeping a certain black pride and resistance going. Their "on the ground" work is very important in keeping an anti-racist mentality going. As a black anarchist, that’s MY issue to deal with cuz they’se MY FOLKS. But it points to where anarchism and nationalism have differences, and that is in [non-black] anarchists having NO understanding of what it means to be BLACK in this fucked up society.

At root, the basic difference between anarchism and anti-state nationalism is that in nationalism the primary political unit is the nation, or ethnic group, whereas in an anarchist system the primary political unit is the local community or the place where labor occurs. Post-colonial anarchism is therefore clearly distinct from any form of nationalism in that it does not seek to make the nation a political unit - let alone the primary political unit. Just as social anarchists seek to create a socialist economy but oppose the tyranny of Marxist state socialism, post-colonial anarchists oppose the tyranny of nationalism, and argue that the achievement of meaningful self-determination for all of the world's nations requires an anarchist political system based on local control, free federation and mutual aid.

African anarchism 

Sam Mbah and I. E. Igariwey in African Anarchism: The History of a Movement make the claim that:

The reason why traditional African societies are characterized as "anarchies" is because of their horizontal political structure and absence of classes. The traditional legal system of Somalia, known as Xeer, is one example of this.

Xeer, pronounced , is the polycentric legal system of Somalia. Under this system, elders serve as judges and help mediate cases using precedents. It is a good example of how customary law works within a stateless society and is a fair approximation of what is thought of as natural law. Several scholars have noted that even though Xeer may be centuries old, it has the potential to serve as the legal system of a modern, well-functioning economy.

Black or "Panther" anarchism 

Black anarchism opposes the existence of a state and subjugation and domination of people of color, and favors a non-hierarchical organization of society. Black anarchists seek to abolish white supremacy, patriarchy, capitalism, and the state. Theorists include Ashanti Alston, Lorenzo Kom'boa Ervin, Kuwasi Balagoon, and Martin Sostre.

Black anarchists have criticized both the hierarchical organization of the Black Panther Party, and the anarchist movement, on the grounds that it has traditionally been Eurocentric and/or white supremacist. They oppose the anti-racist conception, based on the universalism of the Enlightenment, which is proposed by the anarchist workers' tradition, arguing that it is not adequate enough to struggle against racism and that it disguises real inequalities by proclaiming a de jure equality.

Black anarchists are thus influenced by the civil rights movement and the Black Panther Party, and seek to forge their own movement that represents their own identity and tailored to their own unique situation. However, in contrast to black activism that was, in the past, based in leadership from hierarchical organizations, black anarchism rejects such methodology in favor of developing organically through communication and cooperation to bring about a social, cultural and economic revolution that does away with all forms of domination. From Alston's @narchist Panther Zine:

"Panther anarchism is ready, willing and able to challenge old nationalist and revolutionary notions that have been accepted as ‘common-sense.’ It also challenges the bullshit in our lives and in the so-called movement that holds us back from building a genuine movement based on the enjoyment of life, diversity, practical self-determination and multi-faceted resistance to the Babylonian Pigocracy. This Pigocracy is in our ‘heads,’ our relationships as well as in the institutions that have a vested interest in our eternal domination."

Celtic anarchism

Ecology
The influence of the modern revival of Celtic culture on anarchism are particularly evident within the radical wing of the environmentalist movement, particularly Deep Ecology. Earth First! is one of the largest networks organizing around these issues and is organized along anarchist lines with many of the people who work under its banner self-identifying as anarchists. It is perhaps natural that the British and Irish Earth First! movements in particular would seek inspiration from and consciously seek linkages with Celtic identities, given that the ancient Celts are commonly portrayed as being more in touch with nature than modern consumer society. The Earth First Journal, the main publication of the movement, organizes its printing schedule around the Neopagan Wheel of the Year, which consists of four Gaelic festivals and four Germanic ones, with issues named for Beltane, Eostar, Brigid, Samhain, Yule, Mabon, and Lughnasadh.

In Ireland

The armed struggle against British rule in Ireland, particularly up to and during the Irish War of Independence, is portrayed as a national liberation struggle within the Celtic anarchist milieu. Anarchists, including the Irish Workers Solidarity Movement, support a complete end to British involvement in Ireland, a stance traditionally associated with Irish republicanism, but are also very critical of statist nationalism and the IRA in particular. In two articles published on Anarkismo.net, Andrew Flood of the WSM outlines what he argues was the betrayal of class struggle by the IRA during the war of independence, and argues that the statism of traditional Irish nationalism forced it to place the interests of wealthy Irish nationalists who were financing the revolution ahead of the interests of the vast majority of Ireland's poor. The example of the Irish Citizens Army, a workers militia which was led by James Connolly and based in the radical wing of the Irish union movement, is held up as a better example of how the larger revolutionary movement could have — and should have — been organized. According to Irish anarchist nationalist Andrew Flood:
Anarchists are not nationalists, in fact we are completely against nationalism. We don't worry about where your granny was born, whether you can speak Irish or if you drink a green milkshake in McDonalds on St Patrick's Day. 
But this doesn't mean we can ignore nations. They do exist; and some nationalities are picked on, discriminated against because of their nationality. Irish history bears a lot of witness to this. 
The Kurds, Native Americans, Chechins, and many more have suffered also - and to an amazingly barbaric degree. National oppression is wrong. It divides working class people, causes terrible suffering and strengthens the hand of the ruling class. Our opposition to this makes us anti-imperialists. ...

So fight national oppression but look beyond nationalism. We can do a lot better. Changing the world for the better will be a hard struggle so we should make sure that we look for the best possible society to live in. 
We look forward to a world without borders, where the great majority of people have as much right to freely move about as the idle rich do today. A worldwide federation of free peoples - classless and stateless - where we produce to satisfy needs and all have control over our destinies - that's a goal worth struggling for.

Independence anarchism 

Independence anarchism (also known as anarcho-independentism) attempts to synthesise certain aspects of national liberation movements with an opposition to hierarchical institutions grounded in libertarian socialism. Where a certain nation or people exists with its own distinct language, culture and self-identity, independence anarchists concur with supporters of nationalism that such a nation is entitled to self-determination. While statist nationalists advocate the resolution of national questions by the formation of new states, independence anarchists advocate self-government without the need for a state and are committed to the key anarchist societal principles of federalisation, mutual aid and anarchist economics. Some supporters of the movement defend its position as a tactical one, arguing that secessionism and self-organisation is a particularly effective strategy with which to challenge state power.

Some examples of independence anarchist organizations in the Catalan Countries include the Federació Anarcocomunista Catalana (FACC) and the Icària collective in the 1980s, and Recerca Autònoma in the 1990s. One example of an independence anarchist group in Catalonia active nowadays is Negres Tempestes, a self-identified  organization that participates in struggles to defend the Catalan language and culture, while opposing "dogma, states or borders". They also view the state as "a basis of authority, repression and economic exploitation".

Independence anarchism frames national questions primarily in terms of equality, and the right of all peoples to cultural autonomy, linguistic rights, etc. Being grounded in such concepts, independence anarchism is strongly opposed to racism, xenophobia, national supremacism and isolationism of any kind, favouring instead internationalism and cooperation between peoples. Independence anarchists also stand opposed to homogenisation within cultures, holding diversity as a core principle. Those who identify as part of the tendency may also ground their position in a commitment to class struggle (anarcho-communism and anarcho-syndicalism), ecology (green anarchism), feminism (anarcha-feminism), and LGBT liberation (queer anarchism).

Notes and references

External links 
Post Colonial Anarchism: Essays on race, repression and culture in communities of color 1999-2004 by Roger White
Black Anarchism: A Reader
Por la independencia total y la anarquía sin límites by the Icària collective

Anarchist schools of thought
Issues in anarchism
Anarchism
Neocolonialism